Travis Field may refer to:

 Savannah/Hilton Head International Airport, formerly Travis Field
 Travis Field (Bryan, TX), now known as Edible Field